Grogport (Scottish Gaelic: Gròb-phort) is a hamlet in Argyll and Bute, Scotland. It lies on the coast of Kintyre, on the Kilbrannan Sound, across from Pirnmill on the Isle of Arran.

On the coast side of the B842 road that runs through Grogport, there is a picnic spot on the beach, with views of Arran across the water. On the other side of the road lies the remnants of a Bronze Age Cist, a stone burial chamber. The Cist is known locally as "The Sailor's Grave" and is estimated to date to approximately 2000 BC.

Gallery

References

 Royal Commission on the Ancient and Historical Monuments and Constructions of Scotland. 1971. Argyll: Kintyre, 233 pages

Hamlets in Scotland
Villages in Kintyre